A. K. Shastry (Anant Krishna Shastry) was an Indian historian in the state of Karnataka, India.

Life
Shastry was the first scholar to extensively study and research manuscripts called Kadata. He also studied more than a hundred thousand palm leaf and paper manuscripts.

Shastry's research focuses on social, political, economic and religious aspects of Sringeri Dharmasamsthana in particular and Karnataka in general, during this time period.

Shastry's major work involves reading, translating/transliterating from "modi kannada" Modi alphabet - an old Kannada script, and generating source material from these manuscripts. He has written several large volumes of source material books that capture these documents verbatim with commentary and analysis. Due to his work on Kadatas, he is known as "Kadata Shastry" in Karnataka's history circles.

He has presided over several state and national level history seminars. He was a professor of history at MES's M. M. College of Arts and Science, Sirsi, affiliated to Karnatak University, Dharwad, from 1964 to 1998.

Books and research

Academic
 A History of Shringeri:  Karnatak University, Dharwad. 1st edition 1982, 2nd edition 1999.
 Sringeri Dharmasamsthana (Kannada) : Sringeri Matha, 1983
 Sringeriya Itihasa (Kannada) : Karnatak University, Dharwad. Three editions
 France Deshada Mahakranti (Kannada):  Karnatak University, Dharwad
 The records of the Sringeri Matha relating to Keladi: Keladi Museum, 2001
 Selections from the Kadatas of the Sringeri Matha: Unpublished, Indian Council of Historical Research, New Delhi, 1982
 A Catalogue of the Sringeri Records :  Karnataka State Archives, Bangalore, 1995/1996
 Kannadadalli Kadatagalu: Kannada Sahatya Parishat, Bangalore, 1997
 Sirsi Talukina Itihasa (Kannada) : M.E Society, Sirsi, 1988
 Sri Sonda Swarnavalli Mahasamsthanada Aitihasika Dakhalegalu (Kannada):    Karnataka State Archives, Bangalore, 1997
 Sri Swarnavalli Mahasamsthana (Kannada): Sri Sarwajnendra Sarasvati Pratishthana, Swarnavalli, 1997
 A History of the Swarnavalli Mahasamsthana:  Sri Bhagavatpada Prakashana, Swarnavalli, 2004
 Sri Manjuguni Kshetrada Charitrika Dakhalegalu (Kannada):  Karnataka State Archives, Bangalore, 1997
 The Historical Records Relating to the Kanara Districts: Unpublished, U.G.C, New Delhi, 2002
 Idagunjiya Sri Mahaganapati Mattu Sabhahitaru (English & Kannada): Lilaganapati Charitable Trust, Haldipur, 2004
 Sringeri Mathada Kadatagalalliya Aayda Charitrika Dakhalegalu (Kannada):    Karnataka State Archives, Bangalore, 2003
 Ramrao Divgi - A Karmayogi : Divgi Family, Sirsi, 2005
 Kadambotsava Smarana Sanchike : Editor, 1996
 Sirsi Taluka Darpana : Editor, M.E Society, Sirsi, 1988
 The Karnataka Historical Review : Editor, Dharwad, Vol XXVI
 The Records of the Sringeri Dharmasamsthana : Sringeri Matha, 2009 (U.G.C New Delhi)
 The Records of Sri Chitrapur Matha : 2008
 Banavasi (English): Department of Archeology, Museums and Heritage, Bangalore, 2011
 Banavasi (Kannada): Department of Archeology, Museums and Heritage, Bangalore, 2010

Poems
 Upakhyana (Kannada), Sirsi, 1982
 Anisikegalu (Kannada), Pampa Prakashana, Sirsi, 1993
 Ananta Chutukugalu (Kannada), Sirsi, 2010
 Chuti Chutukugalu (Kannada), Sirsi, Bhavani Prakashana, 2012

Biographies

 In 1998, a felicitation volume called 'Itihasa Samshodhaka', edited by Dr. G. M Hegde, was published
 In 2015, on the occasion of Dr. Shastry's 75th birthday, a felicitation volume called 'Ananta Krishna Charita', edited by Ganapati Bhat, Vargasar, was published

References

External links
 The Records of The Sringeri Dharmasamsthana
 Bibliographic Detail in National Library, Ministry of Culture, Govt. of India
 Banavasi: Resting on past glory
 ಸಾಹಿತ್ಯದಲ್ಲೂ ಚರಿತ್ರೆ ಮಿಳಿತ - ಡಾ.ಶಾಸ್ತ್ರಿ, ವಿಜಯ ಕರ್ನಾಟಕ ಪತ್ರಿಕೆ, ೪ ಫೆಬ್ರುವರಿ ೨೦೧೪
 ಮಠಗಳು ಸಮಾಜದಲ್ಲಿ ಸಾಮರಸ್ಯ ಮೂಡಿಸಲಿ, ಪ್ರಜಾವಾಣಿ ವಾರ್ತೆ, ೩ ಮಾರ್ಚ್ ೨೦೧೪
 Book on amazon.com - The Records of the Sringeri Dharmasamsthana

1940 births
2020 deaths
20th-century Indian historians
People from Uttara Kannada
Karnatak University alumni
Kannada-language writers
Indian male writers
Poets from Karnataka
Scholars from Karnataka